Condy may refer to:

Surname
Gillian Condy (born 1952), South African botanical artist
Henry Bollmann Condy, 19th century British chemist and industrialist
Jack Condy (born 1994), Welsh rugby union player
Jonathan Condy (1770–1828), American lawyer
Nicholas Condy (1793–1857), English landscape painter
Nicholas Matthews Condy (1816–1851), British maritime painter, son of Nicholas Condy
Richard Condie (born 1942), Canadian animator, film maker and musician
Richard P. Condie (1898–1985), conductor of the Mormon Tabernacle Choir from 1957 to 1974
Spencer J. Condie (born 1940), general authority of The Church of Jesus Christ of Latter-day Saints

Given name
Condy Raguet (1784–1842), American politician and free trade advocate, first chargé d'affaires to Brazil
Condy Dabney, American convicted of murdering a girl who was later found alive in 1927

Other
Condy (κόνδυ), an ancient drinking vessel

See also
Condoleezza Rice (born 1954), informally shortened to Condie, former United States Secretary of State
Natural-gas condensate, a low-density mixture of hydrocarbon liquids